A skerry is a small rocky island, or islet, usually too small for human habitation. It may simply be a rocky reef. A skerry can also be called a low sea stack.

A skerry may have vegetative life such as moss and small, hardy grasses. They are often used as resting places by animals such as seals and birds.

Etymology
The term skerry is derived from the Old Norse , which means a rock in the sea (which in turn derives from the Proto-Indo-European root *sker-, "cut", in the sense of a rock cut off from the land).

Formation
Skerries are most commonly formed at the outlet of fjords where submerged glacially formed valleys at right angles to the coast join with other cross valleys in a complex array. In some places near the seaward margins of fjorded areas, the ice-scoured channels are so numerous and varied in direction that the rocky coast is divided into thousands of island blocks, some large and mountainous, while others are merely rocky points or rock reefs that menace navigation.

Examples

Many of the cross fjords are so arranged that they parallel the coast and provide a protected channel behind an almost unbroken succession of rocky islands and skerries. By this channel one can travel through a protected passage almost the entire  route from Stavanger to North Cape, Norway. The Blindleia is a skerry-protected waterway that starts near Kristiansand in southern Norway and continues past Lillesand.

The Inside Passage provides a similar route from Seattle, Washington, to Skagway, Alaska, United States. Another such skerry-protected passage extends from the Straits of Magellan north for  along the west coast of the South American continent.

The Swedish coast along Bohuslän is likewise guarded by skerries. Even the east coast of Sweden, in the Baltic Sea, has many big  (archipelagos), notably Stockholm Archipelago.

The southwestern coast of Finland also has a great many skerries; so many, in fact, that they form an archipelago. This area is experiencing post-glacial rebound that connects the rising islands as they break sea level, revealing till deposits and eventually clay bottoms. The skerries exist as small rocky islands before uplift of adjacent terrain changes the classification of this landform into a tombolo.

In the Russian Federation, the best examples are the Minina Skerries, located in the Kara Sea, in the western shores of the Taymyr Peninsula, and the Sumsky Skerries, located in the White Sea.

The United Kingdom has a large number of skerries including Staple Island (an outer Farne Island) in England; a small rocky outcrop near the Fowlsheugh in northeast Scotland; numerous reefs in the Hebrides such as Dubh Artach and Skerryvore; and The Skerries, located off the Antrim coast of Northern Ireland.

Skerries is the name of a coastal area of Dublin, Ireland, with many skerries offshore, including Rockabill, Shenick Island, Colt Island and St Patrick's Island.

See also 

 Stack (geology)

References

External links 
 

 
Scots language
Scottish coast
Islands by type